The IPSC Action Air World Shoot is the highest level Action Air match within the International Practical Shooting Confederation (IPSC). The Action Air World Shoots are currently held triennially on the same cycle as the IPSC Shotgun World Shoots.

The first Action Air World Shoot was be held in 2018 at the KITEC Exhibition Centre in Hong Kong. 

The second Action Air World Shoot was originally to be held in Sochi, Russia. However, in reaction to the 2022 Russian invasion of Ukraine, the IPSC cancelled it along with all scheduled and future level 3 and above international competitions in Russia.

History 
 2018 Action Air World Shoot at the KITEC Exhibition Centre in Hong Kong

Individual Champions

Overall category

Lady category

Junior category

Senior category

Super Senior category

See also 
 IPSC Handgun World Shoots
 IPSC Rifle World Shoots
 IPSC Shotgun World Shoots
 List of world sports championships

References

External links 
Promo: 2015 IPSC Shotgun World Shoot, Italy